The 2015 League of Ireland Cup Final was the final match of the 2015 League of Ireland Cup, played between Galway United and St Patrick's Athletic. The match was played on 19 September 2015 at 6.05 pm. Galway's route to the final involved them being drawn at home in every round and beating Finn Harps, Cockhill Celtic, Bohemians and Dundalk. St Pat's however were drawn away from home in every round and knocked out Crumlin United, Cork City and Shamrock Rovers en route to the final. The game played out as a 0–0 draw after 120 minutes, with Pats' young goalkeeper Conor O'Malley's save winning the cup 4-3 on penalties for the Inchicore side.

Match

See also
 2015 FAI Cup
 2015 League of Ireland
 2015 League of Ireland Cup

References

League of Ireland Cup finals
League Cup Final
League Of Ireland Cup Final 2015
Cup
League Of Ireland Cup Final 2015